Jacob Christopher Wilson (born 22 January 1986) is an American former soccer player who played as a forward.

Career

In 2004, Wilson joined American side California Golden Bears. In 2011, he signed for German fifth tier side Germania Schöneiche. In 2012, Wilson signed for Feirense in the Portuguese second tier, where he made 4 league appearances and scored 0 goals. On 2 September 2012, he debuted for Feirense during a 1–2 loss to Portimonense. Before the second half of 2012–13, Wilson signed for Hungarian second tier club Vasas, where he suffered an injury. Before the second half of 2013–14, he signed for SpVgg Bayern Hof in the German fourth tier.

References

External links
 Jacob Wilson at playmakerstats.com

1986 births
American expatriate soccer players
American expatriate soccer players in Germany
American expatriate sportspeople in Hungary
American expatriate sportspeople in Portugal
American soccer players
Association football forwards
California Golden Bears men's soccer players
C.D. Feirense players
Expatriate footballers in Germany
Expatriate footballers in Hungary
Expatriate footballers in Portugal
Liga Portugal 2 players
Living people
Nemzeti Bajnokság II players
Oberliga (football) players
Regionalliga players
San Francisco Seals (soccer) players
San Jose Frogs players
SpVgg Bayern Hof players
SV Germania Schöneiche players
USL League Two players
Vasas SC players